The 2015 Northeast Conference baseball tournament began on May 21 and ended on May 24 at Senator Thomas J. Dodd Memorial Stadium in Norwich, Connecticut.  The league's top four teams finishers competed in the double elimination tournament.   won their fourth tournament championship to earn the Northeast Conference's automatic bid to the 2015 NCAA Division I baseball tournament.

Seeding and format
The top four finishers will be seeded one through four based on conference regular-season winning percentage. They will then play a double-elimination tournament.

Bracket

All-Tournament Team
The following players were named to the All-Tournament Team.

Most Valuable Player
Jesus Medina was named Tournament Most Valuable Player.  Medina was an infielder and pitcher for Sacred Heart, and batted .444 with a tournament-high eight hits and six runs scored while also pitching 7 one-run innings in the first matchup with Bryant.

References

Tournament
Northeast Conference Baseball Tournament
Northeast Conference baseball tournament
Northeast Conference baseball tournament